The Carlowville Historic District is a historic district in the community of Carlowville, Alabama. It was placed on the National Register of Historic Places on January 18, 1978.

Description

The Carlowville Historic District was nominated to the National Register as a "pleasant blending of nineteenth and twentieth century architecture in quiet, rural environment."  The earlier buildings are predominantly wood-frame structures.  They range from elegant mansions to plain folk houses.   Some of the homes continue to be owned by descendants of the original builders who
came here from the Atlantic seaboard nearly 200 years ago.

Several of the more substantial houses were built atop brick basements.  Two of these structures had their original brick ground floor removed and were subsequently lowered during the twentieth century.  Architectural historians have attributed this to dampness and the poor quality of the local brick.

Contributing structures
At the time of the nomination, the Carlowville Historic District contained 21 contributing properties, built primarily in the Colonial Georgian, Federal, and Greek Revival styles.  Greek Revival is the dominate style.  The contributing buildings recognized by architectural historians as the most important structures to the district include: the Rumpt-Alison House (built circa 1840), a two-story Greek Revival-style house with a two-tiered portico; the Alison-Wade House (1849), a two-story Colonial Georgian-style house with a small one-story porch; St. Paul's Episcopal Church (1838), with a Greek Revival-style tetrastyle Doric portico and late nineteenth century Gothic Revival-style bell tower and windows; Carlowville Baptist Church (circa 1837), an end-gabled Federal-style building with a central entrance porch; the Lee-Wade House (1841), an end-gabled two-story Greek Revival-style house with a monumental portico that originally had a brick ground story; the Alison-Youngblood House (1833), remodeled in the Neoclassical style during the 1920s; the St. Paul's Episcopal Church Rectory (mid-nineteenth century), a one-story Greek Revival-style building that originally had a brick ground story; and the Calhoun Law Office (1840), a small Greek Revival-style professional building that was built by Judge James Martin Calhoun, a nephew of John C. Calhoun.

References

National Register of Historic Places in Dallas County, Alabama
Historic districts in Dallas County, Alabama
Federal architecture in Alabama
Greek Revival architecture in Alabama
Historic districts on the National Register of Historic Places in Alabama